Stefan Wessels (born 28 February 1979) is a German former professional footballer who played as a goalkeeper.

Club career

Bayern Munich
Wessels was a youth team player at Bayern Munich, who progressed through the reserve team and broke into the first-team squad in September 1999 after Bayern lost both goalkeepers Oliver Kahn and Bernd Dreher to injury. Wessels' first game was a 1–1 draw at Ibrox against Rangers in the Champions League. He performed impressively whenever called upon, but was unable to dislodge Kahn for more playing time. Wessels was involved in a hugely successful period for Bayern, including the 2001 Champions League win, but eventually left for 1. FC Köln in 2003, seeking first-team football. Between 1999 and 2003, he appeared in a total of eighteen matches for Bayern.

1. FC Köln
Wessels' time in Köln was eventful, with the club relegated in his first season, before immediately gaining promotion back to the 1st division and again being relegated to the 2. Bundesliga the following season. Showing consistently good performances, Wessels was one of the few players to stand out in the squad. However, at the beginning of the 2007–08 season, Colombian goalkeeper Faryd Mondragón signed with the club, and after a fair but intense rivalry, Wessels lost his position as the club's number 1.

Everton
On 6 August 2007, Wessels agreed to a trial in England with Premier League team Everton and subsequently signed an initial one-year contract with the club on 21 August; he was given his favoured number 33 shirt. Upon signing he said:

"I am excited to be here in England. It is the first time I have played for a club outside of Germany but the Premier League is a very exciting league and I am looking forward to my time here at Everton."

Wessels was the first German player to sign for Everton in the club's history. Following a hand-injury sustained to first choice goalkeeper Tim Howard, Wessels made his Everton debut in the 1–0 home defeat to Manchester United on 15 September 2007. He made his European debut for Everton during a 1–1 draw with Ukrainian team Metalist Kharkiv and he also played against Aston Villa and Sheffield Wednesday, keeping Everton's first clean sheet of the season against the latter. However, he lost his place in the team to the returning Tim Howard for the following game against Middlesbrough.

After the game on 11 May, Everton manager David Moyes revealed that Wessels and fellow team member Thomas Gravesen would leave the club after their contracts expired. David Moyes said "I would like to thank Stefan Wessels who, after today, will be leaving us. His level of professionalism has been a credit to him and he has been a great man to have around the club."

VfL Osnabrück
In June 2008, Wessels signed a two-year contract with VfL Osnabrück of the 2. Bundesliga. He started the 2008–09 season as their first-choice goalkeeper, making his competitive debut on 8 August 2008 in their 2–0 defeat at FSV Frankfurt in the first round of the DFB-Pokal and going on to make his league debut in a 2–2 draw at FC St. Pauli on 15 August 2008. He played 21 league games for VfL, but left in June 2009, after their relegation from the 2. Bundesliga.

Basel
On 23 October 2009, Wessels signed for the Swiss side FC Basel until the end of the 2009–10 season, as a replacement for injured goalkeeper Franco Costanzo. He was able to sign outside the transfer window because he was free agent. He said "I am very pleased that it has worked out with FC Basel, and the wait has been worthwhile. I'm happy that I've signed with such a big club." He joined Basel's first team during their 2009–10 season under head coach Thorsten Fink, who he played alongside while at Bayern Munich.

After playing in one test game, Wessels played his team debut for the club in the home game in the St. Jakob-Park on 20 November as Basel won 4–2 against rivals Zürich. He played his domestic league debut for the club nine days later in the away game in the Stadion Wankdorf as Basel were defeated 2–0 by Young Boys. In the 35th minute referee Massimo Busacca awarded the home team a penalty following a handball. Wessel held the spot kick taken by Gilles Yapi Yapo.

At the end of the 2009–10 season he won the Double with his club. They won the League Championship title with 3 points advantage over second placed Young Boys. The team won the Swiss Cup, winning the final 6–0 against Lausanne-Sport. 

Wessels left the club at the end of the season becoming free agent. During his time with the club Wessels played a total of 13 games for Basel. One of these games were in the Swiss Super League, one in the Swiss Cup, one in the Europa League and ten were friendly games.

Free agent
In July 2010, Wessels joined West Ham United on trial, and played in the 24 July friendly match against Burton Albion, a 4–2 defeat.

Odense Boldklub
On 27 January 2011, Wessels signed a one and a half-year contract with Odense Boldklub, replacing Northern Irish goalkeeper Roy Carroll.

International career
Wessels has represented Germany, at various youth levels, up to the under-21 team, for whom he made one appearance. He also played for Team 2006, a Germany B team assembled in preparation for the 2006 World Cup, but did not make it into the senior squad.

Career statistics

Honours
Bayern Munich
 Bundesliga: 1999–2000, 2000–01, 2002–03
 DFB-Pokal: 1999–2000, 2002–03
 DFB-Liga-Pokal: 1999, 2000
 UEFA Champions League: 2000–01
 Intercontinental Cup: 2001
 UEFA Super Cup runner-up: 2001

1. FC Köln
 2. Bundesliga: 2004–05

FC Basel
 Swiss Super League: 2009–10
 Swiss Cup: 2009–10

Germany U18
 UEFA Under-18 Championship: runner-up 1998

References

External links
 
 

1979 births
Living people
People from Rahden
Sportspeople from Detmold (region)
German footballers
Germany youth international footballers
Germany under-21 international footballers
Germany B international footballers
German expatriate footballers
German expatriate sportspeople in England
German expatriate sportspeople in Switzerland
German expatriate sportspeople in Denmark
FC Bayern Munich footballers
FC Bayern Munich II players
Everton F.C. players
1. FC Köln players
VfL Osnabrück players
FC Basel players
Odense Boldklub players
Bundesliga players
2. Bundesliga players
Premier League players
Swiss Super League players
Danish Superliga players
Association football goalkeepers
Expatriate footballers in England
Expatriate footballers in Switzerland
Expatriate men's footballers in Denmark
UEFA Champions League winning players
Footballers from North Rhine-Westphalia